Matias Alejandro Chiacchio (born 13 May 1988) is an Argentine former professional footballer who played as a striker.

Career
Chiacchio began his career in Spain with Atlético Madrid and Rayo Majadahonda, before joining the youth ranks of Lecco. At Lecco, he was called up to the first team who were at the time playing in Serie C. He made 19 appearances with the club.

Chiacchio was spotted by Jean-Marc Chanelet of Lyon and was put on trial with Lyon's CFA squad. Following his success, he was signed immediately and spent the rest of the season in the
CFA. He was released shortly after the season.

External links
 

1988 births
Living people
Sportspeople from Buenos Aires Province
Argentine footballers
Association football forwards
Calcio Lecco 1912 players
Olympique Lyonnais players